The Copyright Society of the U.S.A. is the primary scholarly society dedicated to the study of copyright law in the United States.

The Copyright Society of the USA was established in 1953, by a number of copyright scholars and lawyers including Charles B. Seton (1910-2005).  

The Society publishes a long-running journal, the Journal of the Copyright Society of the USA. The Society also hosts annual and midwinter meetings, as well as a variety of educational sessions in its regional chapters. The organization has approximately eleven chapters throughout the country, and is headquartered in New York. The Society hosts the annual "Donald C. Brace Memorial Lecture" (named after Donald Brace, one of the founders of the Harcourt, Brace & Co. publishing company), and presents the annual "Seton Award" for scholarship by a young lawyer (under 40).

Notes

Organizations established in 1953
Copyright law organizations
1953 establishments in the United States
Organizations based in New York City